Khersan may refer to:

Khersan, Iran, a village in Iran
Khersan, Syria, a village in Syria
Khersan River, tributary of the Karun River in Iran

See also

 
 Kherson (disambiguation)